The 12th Central American and Caribbean Age Group Championships in Athletics were hosted in San Salvador, El Salvador, on July 7–8, 2011, one week before the inaugural North American, Central American and Caribbean (NACAC) Senior Championships took place at the same site.

Participation
The competition results are published.

In total there were 104 athletes from 15 federations.  Athletes from Anguilla, Aruba, British Virgin Islands, Honduras, and U.S. Virgin Islands did not earn a medal.

Medal summary

Medal table (unofficial)

Results for the mixed 4 × 100 m relay for the age group 12–13 years are not available.

Team trophies

References

External links
Official CACAC Website 
Official Championship Website

Central American and Caribbean Age Group Championships in Athletics
2006 in Salvadoran sport
Central American and Caribbean U14
Athletic
Athletic
International athletics competitions hosted by El Salvador
2007 in youth sport